Veendum is a 1986 Indian Malayalam film, directed by Joshiy starring Mammootty, Ratheesh, Jayashree and Geethu Mohandas in the lead roles. The film has musical score by Ouseppachan.

Cast

Mammootty as Vijaya Chandran
Jayashree as Lalitha
Ratheesh as Robert d'Souza
Lalu Alex as Sukumaran
Baiju as Bike Passenger
Geethu Mohandas as Anu
Kollam AjithRobert's henchman
Kunchan as Kuttappan
Lalithasree
M. G. Soman as Alex
Mala Aravindan as Sreekar (Driver)
Noohu
P. K. Abraham
Rajasekharan
Santhakumari as Sukumari
Vettoor Purushan One of the Ghosts in Morchary (cameo)

Kothuku Nanappan One of the Ghosts in Morchary (cameo)

Synopsis

On receiving news that her father is admitted in hospital, Lalitha returns to Kerala with her daughter from Mumbai. Her husband Sukumaran was a journalist in Mumbai and was killed a few years ago by an underworld don, Robert d'Souza, for publishing news against his illegal smuggling activities. Now, as his deals have been on a diminishing note, Robert had returned to Kerala with his remaining valuables. However, Kerala police had received information on his arrival via bus, and he was chased by police. Robert manages to escape from the bus and snatches a bike on the way. The bike skids off the road and Robert has an injury. Police search for him in the nearby vicinity, where they found the bike. Coincidentally, it happens to be the neighbourhood of Lalitha's house. Unaware of the same, Robert breaks into Lalitha's house. Though police arrive for searching Lalitha's house, she assuredly tells them that Robert has not broken into her house. Owing to this, the police leave without searching.

Lalitha then goes to hospital, and returns by evening. She then traces the presence of someone in the house. In order to escape from the stranger in the house, she runs to the car. However, Robert follows her to the car. Robert tries to prevent her from moving. Lalitha bangs him on his head with a torch, and as he is dead, she drops the corpse in the beach and returns as if nothing had happened.

Vijaya Chandran, a businessman, follows Lalitha. Though she is not happy in meeting him, he follows her. Once, he visits Lalitha's father and introduces him as Sukumaran's friend in Mumbai. He also reveals a proposal to Lalitha, which she denies. He then reveals to Lalitha what good friends they were. He is an IPS officer in Mumbai fighting against the underworld. However, after the death of Sukumaran, he is quite a bit down in his approach. She is also informed that Robert is not dead and is still following her. Whether they succeed against Robert concludes the story.

Soundtrack
The music was composed by Ouseppachan and the lyrics were written by Shibu Chakravarthy.

Box office
The film was a commercial success and ran in theatre for more than 100 days.

References

External links
 

1986 films
1980s Malayalam-language films
Films scored by Ouseppachan
Films directed by Joshiy